Finally... is an EP by Duluth, Minnesota slowcore group Low, released in 1996.

Track listing
"Anon" – 4:20
"Tomorrow One" – 4:29
"Prisoner" – 3:48
"Turning Over" – 7:46

Track one is originally from The Curtain Hits the Cast. Tracks two and three are originally from the vinyl version of the aforementioned album. Track four is previously unreleased. Tracks two, three, and four can be found on A Lifetime of Temporary Relief: 10 Years of B-Sides and Rarities.

References

1996 EPs
Low (band) EPs
albums produced by Steve Fisk